The 1980 NCAA Indoor Track and Field Championships were contested March 14−15, 1980 at Cobo Arena in Detroit, Michigan at the 16th annual NCAA-sanctioned track meet to determine the individual and team national champions of men's collegiate indoor track and field events in the United States.

UTEP reclaimed the top spot in the team standings, finishing 24 points ahead of defending champions Villanova. The Miners claimed their fifth indoor team title and fifth title in seven seasons.

Qualification
Unlike other NCAA-sponsored sports, there were not separate NCAA Division I, Division II, and Division III championships for indoor track and field until 1985. As such, all athletes and programs from all three divisions were eligible to compete.

Team standings 
 Note: Top 10 only
 Scoring: 6 points for a 1st-place finish, 4 points for 2nd, 3 points for 3rd, 2 points for 4th, and 1 point for 5th
 (DC) = Defending Champions
 Full results

References

NCAA Indoor Track and Field Championships
Ncaa Indoor Track And Field Championships
Ncaa Indoor Track And Field Championships
NCAA Indoor Track and Field Championships
NCAA Indoor Track and Field Championships